Hansjörg Knauthe (born 13 July 1944) is a retired East German biathlete. He won an individual silver and a team bronze medals at the 1972 Olympics. At the world championships he won a team bronze in 1970. He held the individual national title in 1969 and placed second in 1966, 1970 and 1971. Knauthe had a diploma of a sports teacher, but after retiring from competitions, he worked as a personal and property protector at the Saxon State Chancellery.

References 

1944 births
Living people
German male biathletes
Biathletes at the 1968 Winter Olympics
Biathletes at the 1972 Winter Olympics
Olympic biathletes of East Germany
Olympic silver medalists for East Germany
Olympic bronze medalists for East Germany
Olympic medalists in biathlon
Biathlon World Championships medalists
Medalists at the 1972 Winter Olympics